Srosty is a rural locality (a selo) and the administrative center of Srostinsky Selsoviet, Yegoryevsky District, Altai Krai, Russia. The population was 1,948 as of 2013. There are 13 streets.

Geography 
Srosty is located 19 km north of Novoyegoryevskoye (the district's administrative centre) by road. Zhernovtsy is the nearest rural locality.

References 

Rural localities in Yegoryevsky District, Altai Krai